Morland may refer to:

Places
Morland, Cumbria, England
Morland, Kansas, USA

Given names 

 Morland Wilson, Jamaican politician

Surnames
 Morland (surname)

See also 
 Morland Brewery, opened in 1711, closed in 2000
 The Morland Dynasty, a series of novels by Cynthia Harrod-Eagles
 Moorland (disambiguation)
 Mooreland (disambiguation)
 Moreland (disambiguation)
 Westmorland